Juan Manuel Ortiz de Rozas (born 17 July 1949) is an Argentine diplomat. He is a lawyer, studied law at the Universidad Católica de La Plata. He speaks English, French, Portuguese and Italian. He is married and has three children.

References

1949 births
Living people
20th-century Argentine lawyers
Ambassadors of Argentina to Norway
Ambassadors of Argentina to Spain
People from La Plata